The Act of Settlement 1657 was an Act of the Cromwellian Parliament for the Assuring, Confirming and Settling of lands and estates in Ireland. The Act received its Third Reading on 8 June 1657 and received the assent of the Lord Protector the following day. Its purpose was to ratify previous decrees, judgments, grants and instructions made or given by the various officers and councils in applying the Act for the Settlement of Ireland 1652.

References
'June 1657: An Act for the assuring, confirming, and settling of Lands and Estates in Ireland.', Acts and Ordinances of the Interregnum, 1642-1660 (1911), pp. 1100–110. URL: https://www.british-history.ac.uk/report.asp?compid=56606. Date accessed: 12 April 2007.

1657 in law
1657 in England
1657 in Ireland
Acts of the Parliament of England